The Yuhaaviatam of San Manuel Nation is a federally recognized tribe of Serrano people in San Bernardino County, California. 

They are made up of the Yuhaviatam clan of Serrano people, who have historically lived in the San Bernardino Mountains. The tribe was formerly named the San Manuel Band of Mission Indians

The other federally recognized Serrano tribe is the Morongo Band of Mission Indians, located in Riverside County, California.

Government
The Yuhaaviatam of San Manuel Nation is headquartered in San Bernardino in San Bernardino County. The tribe is governed by a democratically elected, seven-person tribal council. Their current tribal chairperson is Ken Ramirez.

Reservation
San Manuel Reservation is a federally recognized Indian reservation in San Bernardino County. Established in 1891, the reservation was named for Santos Manuel, a prominent tribal leader.

In December 2016, the tribe arranged the lighting of the Arrowhead landmark for 14 nights, in honor of the 14 victims killed by domestic terrorists the year before in San Bernardino. This is a California Historical Monument and namesake for various local places. Together with the Morongo Band of Mission Indians of Southern California, the San Manuel Band made a "joint donation totaling $600,000 to the San Bernardino United Relief Fund shortly after the shooting last year.

The Yuhaaviatam of San Manuel Nation employ more than 4000 team members and is one of the primary employers in the Inland Empire region of California. They own and operate Yaamava Resort & Casino (renovated in 2016), Serrano Buffet, The Pines, Rock N’ Brews, Chingon's Kitchen, Tutu's Food Court, and Big Mo's, all located in San Bernardino.

In 2019, the tribe made a donation of $25 million to the Loma Linda University Children’s Hospital. In honor of the donation, the fifth floor of the children's hospital is slated to be named the San Manuel Maternity Pavilion. In 2020, the band made a $9 million gift to the University of Nevada, Las Vegas. The gift will be used for education and innovation related to tribal gaming operations and law.

On October 4, 2021, the Yuhaaviatam of San Manuel Nation won the “Responsible business of the year” award and were runners-up for the “property of the year award” for the Yaamava Resort & Casino.

Education
The reservation is served by the San Bernardino City Unified School District.

See also
 Indigenous peoples of California
 Mission Indians
 Serrano people

Notes

References
 Pritzker, Barry M. A Native American Encyclopedia: History, Culture, and Peoples. Oxford: Oxford University Press, 2000.

External links
 Official San Manuel Band of Mission Indians website
 

Serrano people
California Mission Indians
Federally recognized tribes in the United States
Native American tribes in California
San Bernardino County, California